Hawkswick is a hamlet and civil parish in the Craven district of North Yorkshire, England. Situated in the Yorkshire Dales, it lies in Littondale on the River Skirfare.

The population of the civil parish was estimated at 70 in 2012.

Hawkswick was historically a township in the ancient parish of Arncliffe, part of Staincliffe Wapentake in the West Riding of Yorkshire.  Hawkswick became a separate civil parish in 1866. The parish was transferred to the new county of North Yorkshire in 1974.

References

External links

Villages in North Yorkshire
Civil parishes in North Yorkshire